The Ven.  Albert Fisher Gaskell  (10 February 1874 – 20 December 1950) was Archdeacon of Rochdale from 1935 until his death.

Gaskell was educated at Bath College and Hertford College, Oxford, and ordained in 1900. After curacies  in Salford, Ordsall and Rochdale  he was Vicar of St Jude, Preston from 1909 to 1911 and then of Holy Trinity, Littleborough.

References

1874 births
People educated at Bath College (English public school)
Alumni of Hertford College, Oxford
Archdeacons of Rochdale
1950 deaths